The 1959 NCAA College Division football season was the fourth season of college football in the United States organized by the National Collegiate Athletic Association at the NCAA College Division level.

Conference standings

Rankings

Small college poll
In 1959, United Press International (UPI) conducted its "small college" coaches' poll for the second time; they voted the Bowling Green Falcons, who had a 9–0 record and outscored their opponents 274–83, as the number one team.

United Press International (coaches) final poll
Published on November 27

See also
 1959 NCAA University Division football season
 1959 NAIA football season

References